Hyles may refer to:

Hyles-Anderson College
Jack Hyles (1926–2001), American Baptist minister
Hyles (moth), a genus of hawkmoths in the family Sphingidae

See also
Hyle, a philosophical term for matter or stuff
Hylas (disambiguation)